Rennington is a village in Northumberland, England about  north of Alnwick.

Governance 
Rennington is in the parliamentary constituency of Berwick-upon-Tweed.

References

External links

GENUKI (Accessed: 27 November 2008)

Villages in Northumberland